Loai Taha (born 26 November 1989) is an Israeli footballer who plays for Hapoel Be'er Sheva as a centre-back.

Early life
Taha was born in Arraba, Israel, to a Muslim-Arab family.

Honours

Club
 Hapoel Be'er Sheva
 Israeli Premier League (3): 2015–16, 2016–17, 2017–18
Israel Super Cup (2): 2016, 2017
Toto Cup (1): 2016–17

References

External links 
 

1989 births
Living people
Israeli footballers
Israel international footballers
Arab-Israeli footballers
Arab citizens of Israel
Ahva Arraba F.C. players
Hapoel Karmiel F.C. players
F.C. Ashdod players
Hapoel Kfar Saba F.C. players
Maccabi Umm al-Fahm F.C. players
Hapoel Ra'anana A.F.C. players
Hapoel Be'er Sheva F.C. players
Hapoel Haifa F.C. players
Israeli Premier League players
Liga Leumit players
People from Arraba, Israel
Association football central defenders
Israeli Muslims